Centaurium exaltatum is a species of flowering plant in the gentian family known by the common names desert centaury and tall centaury. It is native to much of western North America from British Columbia to Arizona to Nebraska, where it grows in moist areas, generally with alkaline soils. This is an annual herb which is variable in appearance, especially in different habitat types. It grows up to about 35 centimeters in height, its slender stem with widely spaced pairs of oppositely arranged, pointed leaves 1 to 3 centimeters long. The inflorescence is an open array of flowers, each on a pedicel which may be several centimeters in length. The flower has generally four or five white or pink lobes, each somewhat rolled to appear narrow in shape.

External links
Jepson Manual Treatment
NPS Photos: Santa Monica Mountains
Photo gallery

exaltatum